Pagliarini is an Italian surname. Notable people with the surname include:

 Giancarlo Pagliarini (born 1942), Italian politician
 Luciano Pagliarini (born 1978), Brazilian cyclist
 Mirko Pagliarini (born 1975), Italian footballer
 Robert Pagliarini, American financial planner and writer
 Silvano Pagliarini (born 1950), Italian amateur astronomer

See also
 Asteroid 120040 Pagliarini, named after the astronomer

Italian-language surnames